Rebeka Masarova (born 6 August 1999) is a Spanish–Swiss tennis player. She has career-high WTA rankings of 90 in singles and 136 in doubles. The 2016 French Open junior champion started representing Spain in January 2018.

Personal life
Masarova's mother is Spanish and her father is Slovak. Born in Basel, hometown of Roger Federer, she was inspired to start playing tennis from watching Federer play in his first Wimbledon final in 2003.

Junior career
Grand Slam performance - Singles:
 Australian Open: F (2017)
 French Open: W (2016)
 Wimbledon: 3R (2016)
 US Open: 1R (2015)

Grand Slam performance - Doubles:
 Australian Open: 2R (2017)
 French Open: -
 Wimbledon: -
 US Open: 2R (2015)

In 2016, Masarova reached the juniors semifinals of the Australian Open, where she lost to defending champion Tereza Mihalíková. Later that year, she won the French Open junior title by defeating top-seed Olesya Pervushina in the semifinals and second-seed Amanda Anisimova in the final. Masarova was beaten by British wildcard Gabriella Taylor in the third round of the junior tournament at Wimbledon.

Professional career
Masarova made her WTA Tour singles main-draw debut in 2016 at the Gstaad Ladies Championship, beating former world No. 1, Jelena Janković, in the first round.

2021: Grand Slam debut
Masarova made her Grand Slam debut at the 2021 US Open as a qualifier. On her major debut, she reached the second round defeating Ana Bogdan 6–7(9), 7–6(2), 7–6(9) in the longest women’s match at this major in the Open era. As a result, she moved 55 spots up the rankings, reaching top 200 for the first time in her career.

2023: First WTA final, top 100 & WTA 1000 debuts
Masarova had a strong start to the year, reaching her first WTA final at the Auckland Open as a qualifier, where she lost to Coco Gauff. This catapulted her into the top 100 for the first time in her career. 

At the 2023 Dubai Tennis Championships, she qualified for the main draw by beating Olga Danilovic and Rebecca Marino but then lost to Aliaksandra Sasnovich in the first round.

Performance timeline

Only main-draw results in WTA Tour, Grand Slam tournaments, Fed Cup/Billie Jean King Cup and Olympic Games are included in win–loss records.

Singles
Current after the 2023 Indian Wells Open.

WTA career finals

Singles: 1 (runner-up)

WTA Challenger finals

Singles: 1 (runner-up)

Doubles: 1 (title)

Junior Grand Slam tournament finals

Singles: 2 (1 title, 1 runner–up)

ITF Circuit finals

Singles: 11 (6 titles, 5 runner–ups)

Doubles: 12 (8 titles, 4 runner–ups)

Double bagel matches

Notes

References

External links
 
 

1999 births
Living people
Swiss female tennis players
Spanish female tennis players
Sportspeople from Basel-Stadt
French Open junior champions
Swiss people of Slovak descent
Swiss people of Spanish descent
Spanish people of Slovak descent
Grand Slam (tennis) champions in girls' singles